Courtney M. Leonard (born 1980) is an artist, filmmaker, and activist from the Shinnecock Nation in New York. Her work revolves around issues of ecology and Native identity, specifically their intersection with water, which is essential to the Shinnecock.

References

External links

Living people
1980 births
Date of birth missing (living people)
Place of birth missing (living people)
Shinnecock people
Artists from New York (state)
Filmmakers from New York (state)
21st-century American women artists
21st-century American artists
Native American people from New York (state)
Native American women artists